Living for a Song: A Tribute to Hank Cochran is the fourth studio album by American country music singer Jamey Johnson. It was released in October 2012 via Mercury Nashville on both compact disc and LP record. The album is a tribute to songwriter Hank Cochran.

Critical reception
Thom Jurek of Allmusic rated the album 4 stars out of 5, saying that "Johnson doesn't attempt to draw attention to himself, but instead, presents a series of excellent performances of Cochran's songs with himself as an anchor." American Songwriter's Stephen Deusner rated it 3½ stars, saying that Johnson and the others involved "treat these songs gingerly, even going so far as to gently re-create the countrypolitan arrangements of the originals. If that makes the album sound overly familiar at times, it also means Johnson never strains to update these songs or argue for their relevance." He criticized the album's length, and thought that it could have used younger artists for variety. Along with strong critical acclaim, the album was nominated for the Grammy Award for Best Country Album.

Track listing

Personnel
Musicians

 Bobby Bare – vocals on "I'd Fight the World"
 Ray Benson – electric guitar and vocals on "I Don't Do Windows"
 Zeneba Bowers – violin
 Jim "Moose" Brown – acoustic guitar, piano
 Buddy Cannon – upright bass, background vocals
 Melonie Cannon – background vocals
 Jim Chapman – background vocals
 Hank Cochran – vocals on "Living for a Song"
 Elvis Costello – vocals on "She'll Be Back"
 Chad Cromwell – drums
 Dennis Crouch – upright bass
 Janet Darnell – violin
 David Davidson – violin
 Floyd Domino – piano
 Ronnie Dunn – vocals on "A-11"
 Larry Franklin – fiddle
 Steve Gibson – electric guitar
 Vince Gill – vocals on "A Way to Survive" and "Everything but You"
 Kevin "Swine" Grantt – upright bass
 Jim Grosjean – viola
 Merle Haggard – vocals on "I Fall to Pieces" and "Living for a Song"
 Emmylou Harris – vocals on "Don't Touch Me"
 Stephen Hill – background vocals
 John Hobbs – string arrangements
 Jamey Johnson – acoustic guitar, lead vocals, background vocals
 Shelby Kennedy – background vocals
 Alison Krauss – vocals on "Make the World Go Away"
 Kris Kristofferson – vocals on "Love Makes a Fool of Us All" and "Living for a Song"
 Red Lane – gut string guitar on "Would These Arms Be in Your Way"
 "Cowboy" Eddie Long – steel guitar
 Kenny Malone – percussion
 Liana Manis – background vocals
 Brent Mason – electric guitar, tic tac bass
 David Miller – bass guitar
 Willie Nelson – acoustic guitar and vocals on "Do You Ever Get Tired (Of Hurting Me)", "Everything but You", and "Living for a Song"
 Stefan Petrescu – violin
 Ray Price – vocals on "You Wouldn't Know Love"
 Carole Rabinowitz – cello
 Mickey Raphael – harmonica
 Sarighandi D. Reist – cello
 Eddie Rivers – steel guitar
 Jason Roberts – fiddle
 Leon Russell – vocals on "A Way to Survive" and "Everything but You"
 John Wesley Ryles – background vocals
 David Sanger – drums
 Hank Singer – fiddle
 Pamela Sixfin – violin
 Joe Spivey – fiddle
 George Strait – vocals on "The Eagle"
 Bobby Terry – acoustic guitar, electric guitar
 Wei Tsun Chang – violin
 Robby Turner – dobro, steel guitar
 Dan Tyminski – acoustic guitar
 Tommy White – steel guitar
 Kris Wilkinson – string contractor, viola
 Lonnie Wilson – drums
 Karen Winkleman – violin
 Lee Ann Womack – vocals on "This Ain't My First Rodeo"
 Bobby Wood – Fender Rhodes, synthesizer, Wurlitzer
 Glenn Worf – upright bass

Production

 Shelly Anderson – mastering assistant
 Daniel Baciagalupi – mastering assistant
 Venus Barr – production assistant
 Drew Bollman – engineer
 Paul Bowman – assistant engineer
 Sorrel Brigman – assistant engineer
 Buddy Cannon – producer
 T.W. Cargile – engineer, mixing
 Butch Carr – engineer
 Tony Castle – engineer
 Steve Chadie – engineer
 Dale Dodson – producer
 Leland Elliott – assistant engineer
 Shannon Finnegan – production coordinator
 Angella Grossi – production assistant
 Will Harrison – assistant engineer
 Jonathan Harter – assistant engineer
 Jon Hersey – assistant engineer
 Rob Katz – assistant engineer, engineer
 Charlie Kramsky – assistant engineer
 Andrew Mendelson – mastering
 Seth Morton – assistant engineer
 Willie Nelson – drum triggers
 Chris Owens – assistant engineer
 Matt Rausch – assistant engineer
 David Robinson – assistant engineer
 Jacob Sciba – assistant engineer
 Sam Seifert – engineer
 Brian Wright – executive producer
 Nathan Yarborough – assistant engineer

Charts

Weekly charts

Year-end charts

References

2012 albums
Jamey Johnson albums
Albums produced by Buddy Cannon
Mercury Nashville albums
Tribute albums